Susan Wright is the name of:

 Susan Barrantes (1937–1998), birth name Susan Mary Wright, mother of Sarah, Duchess of York
 Susan Wright (actress) (1947–1991), Canadian actress from Saskatoon
 Susan Webber Wright (born 1948), United States District Court judge
 Sue Wright (born 1970), English squash player
 Susan Wright (murderer) (born 1976), American woman convicted of killing her husband
 Susan Catherine Koerner Wright (1831–1889), mother of aviation pioneers the Wright Brothers
 Susan Wright (politician), committeewoman for the Texas State Republican Executive Committee and widow of former U.S. Representative Ron Wright (2019–2021)